Hakka forms a language group of varieties of Chinese, spoken natively by the Hakka people throughout Southern China and Taiwan and throughout the diaspora areas of East Asia, Southeast Asia and in overseas Chinese communities around the world.

Due to its primary usage in scattered isolated regions where communication is limited to the local area, Hakka has developed numerous varieties or dialects, spoken in different provinces, such as Guangdong, Guangxi, Hainan, Fujian, Sichuan, Hunan, Jiangxi and Guizhou, as well as in Taiwan, Singapore, Malaysia, Thailand and Indonesia. Hakka is not mutually intelligible with Yue, Wu, Southern Min, Mandarin or other branches of Chinese, and itself contains a few mutually unintelligible varieties. It is most closely related to Gan and is sometimes classified as a variety of Gan, with a few northern Hakka varieties even being partially mutually intelligible with southern Gan. There is also a possibility that the similarities are just a result of shared areal features.

Taiwan (where Hakka is the native language of a significant minority of the island's residents) is a center for the study and preservation of the language. Pronunciation differences exist between the Taiwanese Hakka dialects and Mainland China's Hakka dialects; even in Taiwan, two major local varieties of Hakka exist.

The Meixian dialect (Moiyen) of northeast Guangdong in China has been taken as the "standard" dialect by the People's Republic of China. The Guangdong Provincial Education Department created an official romanization of Moiyen in 1960, one of four languages receiving this status in Guangdong.

Etymology
The name of the Hakka people who are the predominant original native speakers of the variety literally means "guest families" or "guest people": Hak means "guest", and ka means "family". Among themselves, Hakka people variously called their language Hak-ka-fa (-va), Hak-fa (-va), Tu-gong-dung-fa (-va), literally "Native Guangdong language", and Ngai-fa (-va), "My/our language". In Tonggu County, Jiangxi province, people call their language Huai-yuan-fa.

History

Early history
It is commonly believed that Hakka people have their origins in several episodes of migration from northern China into southern China during periods of war and civil unrest dating back as far as the end of Western Jin. The forebears of the Hakka came from present-day Central Plains provinces of Henan and Shaanxi, and brought with them features of Chinese varieties spoken in those areas during that time. (Since then, the speech in those regions has evolved into dialects of modern Mandarin). The presence of many archaic features occur in modern Hakka, including final consonants , as are found in other modern southern Chinese varieties, but which have been lost in Mandarin.

Laurent Sagart (2002) considers Hakka and southern Gan Chinese to be sister dialects that descended from a single common ancestral language (Proto-Southern Gan) spoken in central Jiangxi during the Song Dynasty. In Hakka and southern Gan, Sagart (2002) identifies a non-Chinese substratum that is possibly Hmong-Mien, an archaic layer, and a more recent Late Middle Chinese layer. Lexical connections between Hakka, Kra-Dai, and Hmong-Mien have also been suggested by Deng (1999).

Due to the migration of its speakers, Hakka may have been influenced by other language areas through which the Hakka-speaking forebears migrated. For instance, common vocabulary is found in Hakka, Min, and the She (Hmong–Mien) languages. Today, most She people in Fujian and Zhejiang speak Shehua, which is closely related to Hakka.

Linguistic development
A regular pattern of sound change can generally be detected in Hakka, as in most Chinese varieties, of the derivation of phonemes from earlier forms of Chinese. Some examples:
 Characters such as 武 (war, martial arts) or 屋 (room, house), pronounced roughly mwio and uk (mjuX and ʔuwk in Baxter's transcription) in Early Middle Chinese, have an initial v phoneme in Hakka, being vu and vuk in Hakka respectively. Like in Mandarin, labiodentalisation in Hakka also changed mj- to a w-like sound before grave vowels, while Cantonese retained the original distinction (compare Mandarin 武 wǔ, 屋 wū, Cantonese 武 mou5, 屋 uk1).
 Middle Chinese initial phonemes /ɲ/ (ny in Baxter's transcription) of the characters 人 (person, people) and 日 (sun, day), among others, merged with ng- /ŋ/ initials in Hakka (人 ngin, 日 ngit). For comparison, in Mandarin, /ɲ/ became r- /ɻ/ (人 rén, 日 rì), while in Cantonese, it merged with initial y- /j/ (人 yan4, 日 yat6).
 The initial consonant phoneme exhibited by the character 話 (word, speech; Mandarin huà) is pronounced f or v in Hakka (v does not properly exist as a distinct unit in many Chinese varieties).
 The initial consonant of 學  usually corresponds with an h [h] approximant in Hakka and a voiceless alveo-palatal fricative (x [ɕ]) in Mandarin.

Phonology

Dialects

Hakka has as many regional dialects as there are counties with Hakka speakers as the majority. Some of these Hakka dialects are not mutually intelligible with each other. Meixian is surrounded by the counties of Pingyuan, Dabu, Jiaoling, Xingning, Wuhua, and Fengshun. Each county has its own special phonological points of interest.

Tones also vary across the dialects of Hakka. The majority of Hakka dialects have six tones. However, there are dialects which have lost all of their checked tones (rusheng), and the characters originally of this tone class are distributed across the non-ru tones. An example of such a dialect is Changting, which is situated in Western Fujian province. Moreover, there is evidence of the retention of an earlier Hakka tone system in the dialects of Haifeng and Lufeng, situated in coastal southeastern Guangdong province. They contain a yin-yang splitting in the qu tone, giving rise to seven tones in all (with yin-yang registers in ping and ru tones and a shang tone).

In Taiwan, there are two main dialects: Sixian and Hailu (alternatively known as Haifeng; Hailu refers to Haifeng County and Lufeng County). Most Hakka speakers in Taiwan can trace their ancestry to these two regions. Sixian speakers come from Jiaying Prefecture, mainly from the four counties of Chengxiang (now Meixian District), Zhengping (now Jiaoling), Xingning and Pingyuan. Most dialects of Taiwanese Hakka, except Sixian and Dabu, preserved postalveolar consonants (and ), which are uncommon in other southern Chinese varieties.

Huizhou dialect (not to be confused with Huizhou Chinese)
Meixian dialect (otherwise known as Meizhou)
Wuhua dialect 
Xingning dialect
Pingyuan dialect
Jiaoling dialect
Dabu dialect
Fengshun dialect
Hailu dialect 
Sixian dialect 
Raoping dialect (a.k.a. Shangrao)
Zhaoan dialect

Ethnologue reports the dialects of Hakka as being Yue-Tai (Meixian, Wuhua, Raoping, Taiwan Kejia: Meizhou above), Yuezhong (Central Guangdong), Huizhou, Yuebei (Northern Guangdong), Tingzhou (Min-Ke), Ning-Long (Longnan), Yugui, and Tonggu.

Vocabulary

Like other southern Chinese varieties, Hakka retains single syllable words from earlier stages of Chinese; thus a large number of syllables are distinguished by tone and final consonant. This reduces the need for compounding or making words of more than one syllable. However, it is also similar to other Chinese varieties in having words which are made from more than one syllable.

Hakka, as well as numerous other Chinese varieties such as Min and Cantonese, prefers the verb   when referring to saying rather than the Mandarin   (Hakka ).

Writing systems

Chinese script
Hakka Chinese is typically written using Chinese characters (Hàn-jī).

Latin script

Various dialects of Hakka such as Taiwanese Hakka, is sometimes written in the Latin script or Pha̍k-fa-sṳ.

Dialects of Hakka have been written in a number of Latin orthographies, largely for religious purposes, since at least the mid-19th century. The popular The Little Prince has also been translated into Hakka (2000), specifically the Miaoli dialect of Taiwan (itself a variant of the Sixian dialect). This also was dual-script, albeit using the Tongyong Pinyin scheme.

Media

Hakka TV is a state-run, primarily Hakka-language television channel in Taiwan that started in 2003. In mainland China, Meizhou Televisions's Hakka Public Channel has broadcasts 24 hours a day in Hakka since 2006.

See also
 Varieties of Chinese
 Hakka culture
 Hakka Transliteration Scheme
 Pha̍k-fa-sṳ
 Hagfa Pinyim
 Protection of the Varieties of Chinese
 Taiwanese Hakka

Notes

References

Further reading 

 
 
 
 
 
 
 
 Taiwan Language Tool (including Hakka)

 
Languages of China
Languages of Taiwan
Languages of Hong Kong
Chinese languages in Singapore
Languages of Singapore
Languages of Malaysia
Languages of Indonesia
Languages of Vietnam
Languages of Thailand
Languages of Suriname
Languages of India
Languages of Bangladesh
Hakka culture
Varieties of Chinese